Yesterday is a British free-to-air history-oriented television channel broadcasting in the United Kingdom and Ireland. It launched on 30 October 2002 as UK History and relaunched in its current format on 2 March 2009. It is available on satellite through Sky, Freesat and through the digital terrestrial provider Freeview. Hours on Freeview had previously been cut, with transmissions finishing at 6 pm, but were restored on 1 June 2010.

History
The channel originally launched on 30 October 2002 as UK History, a channel for the network's historic documentaries. These were previously found on the channel UK Horizons; however, the launch of UK History allowed the channel to broadcast more programmes in their schedule. The majority of programming on the channel is sourced from the BBC programme archive, through the ownership of the channel by BBC Studios. The launch of the channel also coincided with the launch of the new digital terrestrial provider Freeview, following the collapse of the former provider ITV Digital. The service remained unchanged until 8 March 2004, when the channel changed its name in line with the rest of the UKTV network to UKTV History.

The channel was available full-time on all platforms until 15 October 2007 when the hours were reduced on the Freeview platform, resulting in the channel stopping broadcasting at 6 pm each day. This was a result of the launch of Dave, which took over UKTV History broadcast capacity. UKTV History took over the slot used by the unsuccessful UKTV Bright Ideas that was sharing a slot with Virgin1 and Babestation. The channel's inability to broadcast in prime time on Freeview resulted in a ratings drop. In November 2007, the channel had a 0.3 percent share of all television viewing, compared to 0.5 percent a year earlier. This restriction remained until 1 June 2010, when broadcast time was extended until 1 am each day, following the closure of the Virgin1 +1 channel on Freeview. As a result, the channel can now broadcast fully from 6 am to 1 am daily.

At launch, the channel was originally on channel 12 on Freeview, but moved to channel 19 on 19 September 2012, swapping with sister channel Dave. On 10 June 2019, Yesterday moved to channel 25 on Freeview, a space previously occupied by its former sister channel Home, which Discovery, Inc. acquired along with Good Food and Really as part of a deal with its current owner BBC Studios. On 4 November 2020, the channel moved to channel 26 as part of a move up where every channel from channel 24 to 54 on the platform moved up one place to allow BBC Four to move to channel 24 in Scotland due to new Ofcom rules regarding certain PSB channels requiring greater prominence on EPGs.

As part of a network wide programme of relaunching all the UKTV channels under unique names and brands, the channel was renamed as Yesterday on 2 March 2009. The new channel also took on extra programming including fictional historic series and programmes previously broadcast on UKTV Documentary concerning the natural history of the British Isles.

Since 24 July 2012, Yesterday offers more entertainment-led content along with a design refresh, which includes a new logo and idents, in order to attract a wider and younger audience, along with a new slogan, "Entertainment Inspired By History". For example, the channel has broadcast more repeats of situation comedies, such as Last of the Summer Wine or Butterflies.

In late 2014, Yesterday began slowly decreasing the amount of comedy and drama shown on the channel and branching out into more factual content, with notable additions including natural history, science and engineering alongside the classic slate of history programming.

On 8 December 2015, Yesterday became available on Freesat together with two of its UKTV sister channels Drama and former sister channel, Really.

On 8 July 2022, test transmissions for the HD feed of Yesterday commenced, using the frequency 12226 H 27500 2/3 DVB-S2 8PSK. A month later, on 8 August 2022, Yesterday's HD feed officially launched on Sky Q and Sky HD channel 155 where it replaced the standard definition feed on the EPG. The HD feed was added to Virgin Media in 14 December 2022.

Timeshift

The channel also operates a time shift channel called Yesterday +1 (which was previously called UKTV History +1 before UKTV rebranded their channels), that is available on Sky, Virgin Media, and Freeview. The channel broadcasts the Yesterday schedule one hour later than the main channel, but contains no special programming or branding, with the occasional exception of a different DOG. Yesterday +1 launched on Freeview channel 99 on 22 November 2018 but was removed on 16 January 2019. It returned on Freeview on channel 75 on 15 April 2020, with the channel moving up one slot, next to UKTV's newly acquired sister channel CCXTV, on 7 December 2020 (though channel 74 is only currently used for two hours of teleshopping a night rather than broadcasting any of Yesterday's programmes).

Logo history

Programming
The majority of the channel's programmes are sourced from the BBC programme archives; however, some are bought in from other terrestrial stations and some productions are commissioned by UKTV themselves. Programmes previously shown on terrestrial channels like BBC One, Two and Four are usually edited for timing, to accommodate the current three commercial breaks within each hour-long programme. The most obvious example of this is for programmes originally broadcast on the BBC, as material lasting 58 minutes will be edited down to 42 minutes when shown on Yesterday. Some of Yesterday's notable programmes include:

UKTV/Yesterday Originals
Abandoned Engineering
 Bangers and Cash
Bangers & Cash: Restoring Classics (a spin-off series featuring Derek, Paul and Dave Mathewson)
Great British Landmark Fixers
Hornby: A Model World
Railway Murders
Restoration Workshop
 Secrets of the London Underground
 The Architecture the Railways Built
True Evil: The Making of a Nazi
War Factories

Programmes from the BBC and other broadcasters

 'Allo 'Allo!
 Antiques Roadshow
 Auf Wiedersehen, Pet
 Bargain Hunt
 Battleplan
 Cash in the Attic
 Celebrity Antiques Road Trip
 Charles Darwin and the Tree of Life
 Chemistry: A Volatile History
 Coast
 The Dark Ages: An Age of Light
 David Attenborough's Life Collection
 Fawlty Towers: Re-Opened
 Find My Past
 Genius of Britain
 Goodnight Sweetheart
 Great British Railway Journeys
 Keeping Up Appearances
 Life in Cold Blood
 Museum Secrets
 Ocean Giants
 The Queen's Sister
 The Re-Inventors
 [[Secret History (TV series)|Secret History]] The Secret Life Of... Secrets of War Shock and Awe: The Story of Electricity The Sixties: The Beatles Decade Stonewall Uprising Open All Hours The Two Ronnies Porridge Time Team To the Manor Born Top Gear Treasure Detectives Walking Through History Whatever Happened to the Likely Lads? Wild Canada Wonders of the Solar System Wonders of the Universe The World at War Yes, Prime MinisterPrevious

 10 Things You Don't Know About Above and Beyond Africa All Creatures Great and Small Ancient Rome: The Rise and Fall of an Empire Andrew Marr's History of the World Animal House Atlantis: End of a World, Birth of a Legend Attenborough and the Giant Egg Auschwitz: The Nazis and 'The Final Solution' Australia with Simon Reeve Ballykissangel Bergerac The Best of Men Birdsong Blackadder The Blue Planet Bottom Boom Bang-a-Bang: 50 Years of Eurovision Brave New World with Stephen Hawking Brazil with Michael Palin The Challenger Disaster Countryfile The Country House Revealed The Courageous Heart of Irena Sendler David Attenborough's Natural Curiosities The Diamond Queen Dickinson's Real Deal Digging for Britain dinnerladies Earth: The Power of the Planet Edwardian Farm Egypt Empire Flog It! Frozen Planet Galápagos Ganges 
 Great Barrier Reef 
 Great British Ghosts 
 The Great British Story: A People's History 
 The Green Green Grass Hattie Have I Got News for You Hidden Kingdoms History Cold Case Hitler: The Rise of Evil Human Planet Ice Age Giants Inside Nature's Giants Island at War Japan: Earth's Enchanted Islands Jeeves and Wooster Kenneth Williams: Fantabulosa! King George and Queen Mary Krakatoa: The Last Days Land Girls The Last Day of World War One Last of the Summer Wine Life Life in the Undergrowth The Life of Birds The Life of Mammals Life on Earth Life on Fire The Lost Gods of Easter Island Lost Land of the Jaguar Lost Land of the Tiger Lost Land of the Volcano Lovejoy Madagascar Meet the Romans with Mary Beard Michael Wood's Story of England Miss Marple Mountain Gorilla Mummies Alive Museum of Life Mysteries at the Museum Nature's Great Events The Nazis: A Warning from History New Tricks Nuremberg Oceans The Old Grey Whistle Test: 70s Gold Only Fools and Horses Oz and Hugh Drink to Christmas Oz and James Drink to Britain Parade's End Planet Earth The Planets The Private Life of Plants The Queen's Palaces Rise of the Continents The Royle Family Sharpe The Sixties Steptoe and Son Tenko One Foot in the Grave The Thin Blue Line Timewatch 
 Timothy Spall: ...at Sea 
 Top of the Pops 
 TOWN with Nicholas Crane Treasures of Ancient Rome Victorian Farm 
 Vikings 
 Waiting For God The War Wartime Farm   
 Wild Africa Wild Arabia Wild Caribbean Wild China Wild Colombia with Nigel Marven Who Do You Think You Are? Wonders of Life Yellowstone''

See also
UKTV
Television in the United Kingdom

References

External links

UK History at TVARK
Yesterday at TVARK

Television channels and stations established in 2002
UKTV
UKTV channels
2002 establishments in the United Kingdom